The Newark Yankees were a minor league baseball team based in Newark, Ohio. The Newark "Moundsmen" preceded the Yankees and played as members of the  Class D level Ohio State League from 1944 to 1947, winning the 1944 league championship. The Moundsmen were a minor league affiliate of the St. Louis Browns. The Yankees continued play as members of the Class D level Ohio-Indiana League from 1948 to 1951 as an affiliate of the New York Yankees. The Moundsmen and Yankees hosted minor league home games at White Field from 1944 to 1946 and Arnold Park from 1947 to 1951.

History
Minor league baseball began in Newark, Ohio with a team in the 1889 Ohio State League and continued to 1915 when the Newark New Socks played as members of the Class D level Buckeye League.

1944 to 1947

Newark returned to minor league play in 1944, when the Newark Moundsmen became members of the Class D level Ohio State League and won the Ohio State League Championship. The Moundsmen began play as an affiliate of the St. Louis Browns and played four seasons in the Ohio State League. The 1944 Ohio State League reformed as a six–team league in 1944 after a hiatus due to World War II. Playing with league members Lima Red Birds, Marion Diggers, Middletown Red Sox, Springfield Giants and Zanesville Dodgers, the Moundsmen finished second in the standings. The "Moundsmen" moniker was the result of a newspaper contest. With a regular season record of 71–59, Newark finished in 2nd place, 4.5 games behind the first place Springfield Giants in the regular season standings under manager Clay Bryant. In the 1944 Playoffs the Newark Moundsmen defeated the Lima Red Birds 3 games to 1 and advanced. In the Finals, Newark defeated the Middletown Red Sox 4 games to 2 to claim the championship. Ned Garver led the Ohio State league with 21 wins, 221 strikeouts and a 1.21 ERA. He also hit .407.

Garver enjoyed his time in Newark. "It was a good baseball town – we drew big crowds." The fans were generous to the low-paid players, sometimes collecting $16 to $18 dollars for Garver following a win. When someone stole his glove during the season, the fans raised him enough money to buy a new one. Local restaurants would give the pitchers free meals for winning games.

Continuing play in the 1945 Ohio State League, the Newark Moundsmen finished last in the standings. With a 1945 regular season record of 57–82, the Moundsmen finished in sixth place. Led by manager Mickey O'Neill, Newark finished 32.0 games behind the first place Middletown Rockets in the regular season standings.

The 1946 Newark Moundsmen finished in fourth place as the Ohio State League expanded to eight teams. Newark qualified for the playoffs after the Moundsmen ended the regular season with a record of 74–65 under manager Bob Boken, finishing 8.0 games behind the Springfield Giants. In the first round of the playoffs, Newark lost to the Springfield Giants four games to two.

On June 28, 1946, Newark pitcher Carl Schulte threw a no-hitter in a 7–0 victory over the Richmond Roses.

In 1947, the Ohio State League played its final season, before changing its name. The Newark Moundsmen had a 64–76 regular season record and finished in seventh place, playing the season under manager Ed Dancisak. The Moundsmen finished the season 25.5 games behind the first place Zanesville Dodgers in the eight–team league.

On June 6, 1947, William Woolard of Newark pitched a no–hitter in an 8–0 victory over the Muncie Reds.

1948 to 1951

In 1948, Newark gained a new affiliate as the franchise continued play as members of the Class D level Ohio-Indiana League, when the Ohio State League changed names. The Newark Yankees began play as an affiliate of the New York Yankees. The Lima Terriers, Marion Cubs, Muncie Reds, Portsmouth A's, Richmond Roses, Springfield Giants and Zanesville Dodgers joined the Newark Yankees in league play. With a record of 64–74, Newark finished in 5th place. Managed by Bobby Dill and Solly Mishkin, Newark finished 17.0 games behind the 1st place Zanesville Dodgers.

Continuing Ohio–Indiana League play, the 1949 Newark Yankees had a regular season record of  65–72. The Yankees placed 6th and were managed by Jim McLeod. Newark finished 15.0 games behind the 1st place Portsmouth A's.

Yankee pitcher George Vinston threw a no–hitter on July 22, 1949 in a 3–0 victory over the Marion Red Sox.

The 1950 Newark Yankees reached the Ohio–Indiana League Finals. With an 89–49 record, Newark placed 2nd under manager Billy Holm. Newark finished 1.0 games behind the 1st place Marion Red Sox in the regular season standings. In the first round of the playoffs, the Newark Yankees beat the Richmond Tigers 3 games to 2. In the finals, the Marion Red Sox beat the Newark Yankees 4 games to 0.

In their final season of play, the Newark Yankees won the 1st half standings which ended June 18. The Newark Yankees won the first half of the season by 2.5 games over the Marion Red Sox. On July 17, 1951, the Yankees had a record of 49–31 when the team folded. The 1951 Newark Yankees were managed by Malcolm Mickthen. The Ohio–Indiana League permanently folded after the 1951 season was concluded.

Newark, Ohio was without minor league baseball until the 1994 Newark Buffalos began play as members of the Independent level Frontier League.

The ballparks
From  1944 to 1946, the Newark Moundsmen played home games at White Field. The ballpark was located at North 11th Street & West Church Street. Today, White Field is still in use as a football stadium for Newark School District teams. White Field is located at 70 North 11th Street, Newark, Ohio.

Beginning in 1947, the Moundsmen and Yankees hosted minor league home games at Arnold Park. With a capacity of 3,000 in 1950, Arnold Park was located two blocks from White Field. In 1954, Arnold Park hosted an exhibition game between the Cleveland Indians and Detroit Tigers just before the start of the regular season. The ballpark was located at State Road 16 & State Road 79, Newark, Ohio.

Timeline

Year–by–year record

Notable alumni

Bob Boken (1946, MGR)
Leon Brinkopf (1944)
Clay Bryant (1944, MGR)
Owen Friend (1944)
Ned Garver (1944)
Cal Hogue (1945)
Billy Holm (1950, MGR)
Hal Hudson (1944–1945)
Jim McLeod (1949, MGR)
Connie O'Connor (1944–1945)
Mickey O'Neil (1945, MGR)
Hal Smith (1950)

See also
Newark Moundsmen  playersNewark Yankees players

References

External links
Newark - Baseball Reference

Defunct minor league baseball teams
Professional baseball teams in Ohio
Defunct baseball teams in Ohio
Baseball teams established in 1948
Baseball teams disestablished in 1951
New York Yankees minor league affiliates
Ohio State League teams
Newark, Ohio
Licking County, Ohio
Ohio-Indiana League teams